The Lightning was a Willys straight-6 engine produced in the 1940s and 1950s.  It was used in the Willys Jeep Station Wagon and other Jeep-based vehicles at the time. It was replaced with the Willys Super Hurricane engine.

L148
The L148 version displaced 148 in³ (2.4 L).

Applications:
 1948-1950 Willys Jeep Station Wagon
 1949-1950 Willys-Overland Jeepster

L161
The L161 version displaced 161 in³ (2.6 L).

Applications:
 1950-51 Willys Jeep Station Wagon
 1950 Willys-Overland Jeepster
 1952-55 Willys Aero-Lark
 1953-55 Willys Aero-Falcon

Lightning

Straight-six engines